The Parish Church of Our Lady of Mount Carmel is a Roman Catholic parish church in Salto.

History
The Church of Mount Carmel is famous as the oldest Christian temple in Salto; in 1818 was built the first small chapel dedicated to Our Lady of Mount Carmel. The present temple was built around 1855 and expanded afterwards; it has a big patrimonial value. Its bells date back from 1686 and came from the Jesuitic Missions.

Same devotion
There are other churches in Uruguay dedicated to Our Lady of the Mount Carmel:
 Church of Our Lady of Mt. Carmel
 Church of Our Lady of Mt. Carmel (Aguada)
 Church of Our Lady of Mt. Carmel (Cordón)
 Church of Our Lady of Mt. Carmel and St. Saint Thérèse of Lisieux (Prado)
 Church of Our Lady of Mt. Carmel and St. Cajetan
 Church of Our Lady of Mt. Carmel in Migues
 Church of Our Lady of Mt. Carmel in Toledo
 Church of Our Lady of Mt. Carmel in Capilla del Sauce
 Church of Our Lady of Mt. Carmel in Durazno
 Church of Our Lady of Mt. Carmel in Villa del Carmen
 Church of Our Lady of Mt. Carmel in Melo
 Church of Our Lady of Mt. Carmel in San Gregorio de Polanco
 Church of Our Lady of Mt. Carmel in Solís de Mataojo
 Church of Our Lady of Mt. Carmel in Carmelo

See also
 Roman Catholic Diocese of Salto

References

External links
 
 Diocese of Salto - CEU 

Salto, Uruguay
Roman Catholic church buildings in Salto Department
Roman Catholic churches completed in 1855
Our Lady of Mount Carmel
19th-century Roman Catholic church buildings in Uruguay